Monterey Township may refer to the following places in the United States:

 Monterey Township, Michigan
 Monterey Township, Cuming County, Nebraska
 Monterey Township, Putnam County, Ohio

See also

Monterey (disambiguation)

Township name disambiguation pages